Endang is a common given first name for women in Indonesia and occasionally for men. Notable people with the first name Endang include:

Endang Nursugianti, (born 1983) Indonesian badminton player 
Endang Rahayu Sedyaningsih, (1955–2012) Indonesian health minister from October 22, 2009 until April 30, 2012 
Endang Turmudi, (born 1955) Indonesian sociologist and Research Professor
Endang Witarsa, (1916–2008) Indonesian soccer player and coach

Indonesian feminine given names
Indonesian masculine given names
Unisex given names